Elektro-L No.2 is a Russian geostationary weather satellite which launched on 11 December 2015. 
It is the second Elektro-L spacecraft to fly, after Elektro-L No.1 launched in 2011.
The space platform has an upgrade in star trackers (EADS Sodern SED26) and radio complex.
The MSU-GS camera passes additional tests to improve performance in infrared channels.

Launch
Originally planned for 2014, the launch date was December 11, 2015 at 13:45:33 UTC. The launch was conducted using a Zenit-3F carrier rocket from the Baikonur, site 45/1.

External links

 Orbital Tracking

Weather satellites of Russia
Spacecraft launched in 2015
2015 in Russia